Laughton en le Morthen is a civil parish in the Metropolitan Borough of Rotherham, South Yorkshire, England.  The parish contains 27 listed buildings that are recorded in the National Heritage List for England.  Of these, one is listed at Grade I, the highest of the three grades, two are at Grade II*, the middle grade, and the others are at Grade II, the lowest grade.  The parish contains the village of Laughton en le Morthen, the smaller settlements of Brookhouse, Carr, and Slade Hooton, and the surrounding countryside.  Most of the listed buildings are houses, cottages and associated structures, farmhouses and farm buildings.  The other listed buildings include a church and its vicarage, a school, a cascade, and a telephone kiosk.


Key

Buildings

References

Citations

Sources

 

Lists of listed buildings in South Yorkshire
Buildings and structures in the Metropolitan Borough of Rotherham